"Still Losing You" is a song written by Mike Reid, and recorded by American country music singer Ronnie Milsap.  It was released in May 1984 as the first single from the album One More Try for Love.

Success and reception
"Still Losing You" was Ronnie Milsap's 38th single to be released and his 25th No. 1 hit on the Billboard country charts, and became one of his biggest hits.  "Still Losing You" was  also a minor hit on the Adult Contemporary charts where it peaked at No. 29. It was originally made exclusive to the album titled One More Try For Love, but is now featured on many of Milsap's compilation albums; these include The Essential Ronnie Milsap, 40 #1 Hits, and Ultimate Ronnie Milsap.

Charts

Weekly charts

Year-end charts

References 

1984 singles
Ronnie Milsap songs
Songs written by Mike Reid (singer)
RCA Records singles
1984 songs